Chadra may refer to:
 Chadra, Chad
 Chadra, Lebanon